The Flyer Advanced Light Strike Vehicle platform has been developed by General Dynamics Ordnance and Tactical Systems (GD-OTS), in partnership with Flyer Defense LLC, for the U.S. Special Operations Command (SOCOM) Ground Mobility Vehicle Program. The Flyer Advanced Light Strike Vehicle platform configurations are the Flyer 72 and the narrower Flyer 60.

Design
The Flyer was designed to fill a need by special operations forces to have a lightweight, mobile platform that could be transported by air and be configured for a variety of missions.  It can be internally transported by V-22 Osprey, CH-53E Super Stallion, CH-47D Chinook, C-130 Hercules, Boeing C-17 Globemaster III and C-5 Galaxy, and be externally transported by UH-60L Black Hawk.  The vehicle can operate at high speeds at long ranges, off-road and in various weather conditions.  It can be configured for many roles including light strike, personnel rescue and recovery, reconnaissance, and communications.  The Flyer has a fuel efficiency of 24 mpg at 40 mph.  Weapons can be mounted on a 360 degree ring or five patient litters can be carried. It also has an armored variant, with the 4-door cab, rear cargo area, and roofline armored to ballistic level B6.

Flyer 72
The Flyer 72 is in service in the United States Special Operations Command as the M1288 GMV 1.1. It was selected in 2013 to replace SOCOM's fleet of 1,072 Humvee-based Ground Mobility Vehicles. 1,300 are planned to be in service by September 2020.

The United Kingdom Special Forces (UKSF) received a Flyer 72 in 2014 for testing under Project Westerly, a program to evaluate vehicles for the potential replacement of their Supacat HMT400 Surveillance and Reconnaissance Vehicle/Offensive Action Vehicles that entered service in 2003.

General Dynamics offered modified Flyer vehicles to the U.S. Army for their 'Ultra Light Combat Vehicle' (ULCV), since renamed the Army Ground Mobility Vehicle (AGMV), and Light Reconnaissance Vehicle (LRV) programs. For the LRV, the Flyer 72 could have armor added, carry six troops, and mount an M230 chain gun.

In May 2018, the Army awarded GD-OTS the contract for production of Army Ground Mobility Vehicles.

A consortium of Oshkosh Defense and Flyer Defense LLC submitted the Flyer 72 for the U.S. Army's Infantry Squad Vehicle competition. This contract was won by a consortium of GM Defense and Ricardo plc, which submitted a vehicle based on the Chevrolet Colorado ZR2.

Flyer 60
On 21 October 2013, General Dynamics was awarded a SOCOM contract for non-developmental V-22 Internally Transportable Vehicles (ITV). The three-year indefinite delivery, indefinite quantity contract is for up to 10 vehicles, with integration and logistical support and training. The total value of the contract is $5.8 million if all options are exercised. They share the same engine, suspension, transmission, and electrical systems.

Operators
  - UKSF: 1 on test
  - Hellenic Army: Flyer I, 4+ for  1st Raider–Paratrooper Brigade, 1st Infantry Division
  - Italian Army: Flyer III, 9 + 18 on option for 9th Paratroopers Assault Regiment "Col Moschin" (SF) 
  - SOCOM: 1,300 planned
  UAE operating GD-OTS Flyer vehicles

See also
 Singapore Army Light Strike Vehicle (Spider/Flyer)
 P6 ATAV
 VLEGA Gaucho
 Chivunk

References

External links
 AUSA 2014 IHS Jane's speaks to General Dynamics Ordnance and Tactical Systems about their Flyer vehicle - YouTube video

 Manufacturer's page

Military trucks of the United States
Special operations commands of the United States Armed Forces
General Dynamics land vehicles
Military vehicles introduced in the 2010s
Post–Cold War armored fighting vehicles of the United States